Rubén Oseguera González (born 14 February 1990), commonly referred to by his alias El Menchito, is a Mexican-American citizen, suspected drug lord and former high-ranking member of the Jalisco New Generation Cartel (CJNG), a criminal group based in Jalisco. He is the son of Nemesio Oseguera Cervantes ("El Mencho"), Mexico's most-wanted man. Under his father, he allegedly worked as the CJNG's second-in-command and managed international drug trafficking operations. Oseguera González was first arrested in January 2014 in Jalisco, but was released in October for lack of evidence and re-arrested immediately as he walked out of prison. He was then released again in December after a judge considered the evidence against him as insufficient. In June 2015, Oseguera González was arrested again, released a month later, and re-arrested as his release order was made official. His legal case has highlighted the growing tensions and deficiencies between prosecutors and judges in Mexico.

In 2017, the United States District Court for the District of Columbia charged Oseguera González with international drug trafficking. According to the indictment, Oseguera González was responsible for shipping narcotics to the U.S. from Mexico between 2007 and 2017, and of using violence to further his criminal activities. Mexico's Secretariat of Foreign Affairs approved his extradition request in 2018, and Oseguera González's motions to prevent his transfer to the U.S. have been denied. In Mexico, he was facing trial for money laundering and illegal possession of military-exclusive firearms. After several appeals, Oseguera González was extradited to the U.S. in February 2020.

Early life and career
Rubén Oseguera González was born on 14 February 1990, in San Francisco County, California. He also holds Mexican citizenship. He has several aliases, including "Rubén Garibay González", "El Junior", "El Rubencito", "El Rojo", "El Niño", and "El Menchito". His last nickname is a diminutive of his father's nickname El Mencho, which comes from the phonetic derivation of his name Nemesio. His mother, Rosalinda González Valencia, is the sister of Abigael González Valencia, a former leader of the Milenio Cartel and Los Cuinis. His father, Nemesio Oseguera Cervantes (alias "El Mencho"), is the leader of the Jalisco New Generation Cartel (CJNG) and one of Mexico's most-wanted men. Oseguera González has two sisters, Jessica Johana and Laisha.

According to Mexican government sources, Oseguera González acted as the CJNG's second-in-command, just below his father. He was allegedly responsible for managing the CJNG's operations in buying and selling narcotics from South America to Mexico. He was also accused of coordinating stolen gasoline sales in Jalisco, leading a group of hitmen who killed people who refused to work with the CJNG, overseeing a line of hitmen responsible for protecting CJNG's turf in Jalisco and Colima from rival gangs like the Knights Templar Cartel and Los Zetas, and managing the CJNG's financial assets.

2014 arrest
Since 2013, Mexican authorities were investigating a public telephone booth line and two cellphones linked with high-ranking leaders of the CJNG. According to intelligence reports, one of the mobile lines received a call from the public booth line from a neighborhood Jardines Universidad in Zapopan, Jalisco, prompting an investigation. The Mexican Army asked the Criminal Investigation Agency (AIC) branch of the Office of the General Prosecutor (PGR) to investigate the neighborhood and the two mobile lines more closely. The Army began to dispatch undercover agents to monitor the neighborhood. On the evening of 29 January 2014, one of the mobile phones was located through geolocation at a neighborhood in Zapopan before it went out of service. The Army and the Navy decided to send a Special Forces unit from Mexico City to Zapopan to investigate the incident.

At 3:30 a.m. CT on 30 January, the Special Forces unit raided a residence in neighborhood Patria Universidad and discovered Oseguera González sleeping there. As the authorities took down the doors, Oseguera González woke up from the loud noise and jumped from his bed, ran to his backyard, and climbed the back wall to reach his neighbor's property. However, the Special Forces unit successfully surrounded the premises and reduced Oseguera González's escape options. He eventually submitted and was arrested in his neighbor's backyard. Two of his henchmen surrendered at the door without resisting arrest. Two others, who were renting a nearby house, fled on foot but were arrested too. Oseguera González reportedly offered the officers who detained him around MXN$17 million to let him go. Authorities confirmed that they confiscated between MXN$10 to $16 million and US$500,000 at the crime scene, as well as 4 assault rifles, 9 handguns, a grenade, and several rounds of ammunition. Former Attorney General of Mexico Jesús Murillo Karam confirmed to the press that no gunshots were fired in the operation.

Oseguera González was flown that day to Mexico City and taken to the SEIDO, Mexico's anti-organized crime investigatory agency, where he gave his statement and was interrogated by law enforcement. Government sources confirmed that he had no pending formal investigations or arrest warrants issued against him in Jalisco. On 1 February, Oseguera González was taken to Federal Social Readaptation Center No. 1 (also known as "Altiplano"), a maximum-security prison in Almoloya de Juárez, State of Mexico. Authorities confirmed that he was arrested because of pending charges of money laundering, drug trafficking, and illegal possession of weapons of military-exclusive use. Oseguera González pleaded not guilty and claimed that he worked in construction and was a car salesperson since he was 16 years old. He also claimed that he inherited properties from his mother after she bought them when he was younger and put them under his name.

In response to the military operation that resulted in Oseguera González's arrest, CJNG gunmen hijacked three buses and set them on fire throughout the Guadalajara Metropolitan Area. No deaths or injuries were reported. The U.S. consulate in Guadalajara sent a warning to U.S. citizens in the city and asked them not to travel in the southern part of the urban area, including the main roads leading to the Guadalajara International Airport. Once the attacks concluded, the Mexican government asked civilians to remain calm and resume their daily activities. Authorities stated that they would remain on alert throughout the Guadalajara area for other violent responses from organized crime.

Releases
On 16 October 2014, Oseguera González was released from Altiplano, but he was re-arrested immediately as he walked out of prison by members of the AIC. He was released because a judge from the State of Mexico absolved him from the following crimes: illegal possession of firearms, having weapons of military-exclusive use, use of resources from illicit origins, and crimes against public health. Once in custody, he was then taken to the SEIDO installations and imprisoned there for two months while the PGR worked on getting his jurisdiction to open a trial against him. On 18 December, he was sent to the Federal Social Readaptation Center No. 2 (also known as "Puente Grande"), a maximum-security prison in Jalisco.

On 26 December, Oseguera González was released from prison again after a judge concluded that there was insufficient evidence against him for the charges of drug trafficking, overseeing the CJNG's financial operations, and leading a group of hitmen.

2015 arrest
On 23 June 2015, Oseguera González was arrested again by the Mexican Army and the Federal Police in the Lomas de Altamira neighborhood in Zapopan, Jalisco, this time along with his brother-in-law Julio Alberto Castillo Rodríguez. The operation lasted about 20 minutes and no shots were fired. The officers entered the private neighborhood in several vehicles at around 2:15 a.m. CT and subdued the entrance guard. They then shot the security cameras with paintball guns to obscure them, destroyed several others, and asked the guard to cut the electricity power in the vicinity. As they were in the entrance booth of the neighborhood, the telephone rang but none of them answered. The guard was then asked to kneel down while the officers entered the neighborhood and apprehended Oseguera González, who was inside a vehicle with Rodríguez Castillo. Authorities confiscated several weapons, including 2 customized AR-15 assault rifles engraved with the insignias "CJNG 02 JR" and "Menchito".

According to government sources, Oseguera González was trying keep a low profile and had undergone a nose surgery to alter his identity. He travelled without bodyguards to avoid attracting attention from law enforcement. The government officially confirmed his identity through DNA and physical tests, and photo evidence. At the time of his arrest, he was wanted for organized crime involvement, using resources from illicit origins (money laundering), and kidnapping. The government alleged that when Oseguera González was released from prison the year before, he rejoined the CJNG and began managing their international drug trafficking operations. Once in custody, he was sent to Mexico City and transferred to the SEIDO installations, where he gave his formal declaration. As Oseguera González arrived at the SEIDO via helicopter, a Black Hawk Federal Police helicopter with snipers guarded the premises.

On 27 June, a federal judge in Toluca issued an arrest warrant for Oseguera González. He was then transferred to Altiplano prison. Oseguera González's defense argued that their client was detained on illegal grounds because some of the charges he was arrested for were absolved by a judge before, add thus consisted double jeopardy. The PGR countered this argument by saying that the judge's actions did not mean an absolution from the charges imposed.

Release and re-arrest
On 1 July 2015, a federal judge from the State of Mexico ordered Oseguera González's release after concluding that the evidence against him was insufficient and that his due process had been violated. The judge stated that when Oseguera González was arrested in June, the officers did not have an arrest warrant against him and entered his private property without legal authorization. He also stated that the detainee was in custody for 9 hours and without a lawyer before he was sent to the justice department. When the judge considered that authorities had failed to prove that Oseguera González was involved in organized crime, he was released. This was the third time he had been released in less than a year. However, as Oseguera González was walked out of Altiplano, he was re-arrested by the PGR, who had a pending arrest warrant against him. According to government sources, he was wanted for organized crime involvement and for participating in the disappearance of two individuals in Tepalcatepec, Michoacán. He was sent again to the SEIDO installations by helicopter and escorted by an armed Blackhawk helicopter.

On 3 July, a federal court approved the PGR's request to keep Oseguera González under a 40-day preventative detention while authorities work on gathering more evidence against the defense. The request was carried out as part of an investigation by the SEIDO against Oseguera González for his alleged participation in kidnapping. Oseguera González's defense, however, responded by issuing a writ of amparo in hopes of preventing their client from being detained without charges being filed. A judge denied the defense's request to remove their client's preventative detention on 16 July. On 12 August, a federal judge approved the PGR's request to extend Oseguera González's preventative detention for 40 additional days in order to allow authorities to continue working on gathering evidence against the defense. Later that day, the PGR decided to remove his preventative detention after considering that they had found enough evidence against him. On 13 August, he was issued an arrest warrant and transferred to Altiplano prison on organized crime and bribery charges. The kidnapping charges were suspended. Oseguera González was also investigated for his alleged participation in the murder of four people at a restaurant in Zapopan on 17 May 2013. According to the detainees, Oseguera González planned the attack.

Imprisonment and legal status
On 28 August 2015, a federal court issued an arrest warrant against Oseguera González and charged him with illegal possession of firearms, using ammunition of exclusive military use, having five weapons of exclusive military use, and organized crime involvement. In October, Oseguera González was transferred from Altiplano to Federal Social Readaptation Center No. 3 (also known as "Noreste") in Matamoros, Tamaulipas. He issued a writ of amparo after claiming that he endured mistreatment and torture. That same month, the PGR opened another case and issued another arrest warrant to charge Oseguera González for acting as the CJNG's second-in-command and ordering homicides against rival drug members. They also stated that he was responsible for coordinating international drug trafficking shipments. The evidence presented to the court consisted of intelligence reports gathered by law enforcement and lawyers. On 4 November, a federal court charged Oseguera González with drug trafficking along with five other suspected CJNG members.

Oseguera González issued another writ of amparo in early 2016 to request a transfer back to Altiplano. In February 2016, however, he was transferred to Federal Social Readaptation Center No. 13 in Miahuatlán de Porfirio Díaz, Oaxaca. His defense responded by preparing a writ of amparo for the supposed violations against their client. On 30 June, the PGR via a federal judge in Toluca issued an arrest warrant against Oseguera González and charged him with illegal possession of firearms, using ammunition of military-exclusive weapons, being in possession of at least five military-exclusive weapons, and organized crime involvement. On 22 August, the writ of amparo for mistreatment and torture issued months before was struck down by a judge after he spoke with the prison staff, who denied their involvement in such violations.

On 10 November, a judge approved Oseguera González's request to receive a conjugal visit. The defendant claimed that he was limited by the prison staff from speaking to his lawyers in the past. The judge did not comment on this matter. On 21 February, a court approved Oseguera González's writ of amparo and invalidated his formal imprisonment for organized crime charges. The judge concluded that the charges had several flaws and the evidence presented was insufficient. According to the court, Oseguera González's organized crime charges were based on the testimonies of two Federal Police officers, who described to investigators that he was part of the leadership structure of the CJNG. The judge did not consider this evidence sufficient because the police did not establish how or where they got this information.

The PGR submitted the weapons seized during Oseguera González's arrests, and a cap with the insignias of the CJNG that Oseguera González had in his possession when he was taken into custody, as evidence of his alleged involvement in organized crime. They also mentioned his biological relationship with his father and the fact that two alleged members of the CJNG told investigators that Oseguera González worked below him as evidence. The judge did not agree that the weapons and the cap proved Oseguera González's militancy in the CJNG. The judge also dismissed the two testimonies of the alleged CJNG members because they gave conflicting assertions when investigators showed them a picture of Oseguera González and asked them to identify him. Oseguera González was not released from prison because he had four additional pending charges that were not invalidated by the court.

On 9 March 2018, a penal court judge tried to have Oseguera González transferred from Oaxaca to the Puente Grande. In July 2019, Oseguera González was transferred to the Federal Social Readaptation Center No. 15, a maximum-security prison in Chiapas. Authorities did this after suspected organized crime members uploaded a video on social media warning of Oseguera González's plot to escape from prison. On 29 August 2019, a federal judge absolved Oseguera González of organized crime involvement and ordered his immediate release. However, he was kept in custody for two additional charges: money laundering and illegal possession of military-exclusive firearms. On 6 September 2019, Oseguera González was transferred to the Federal Social Readaptation Center No. 11 in Hermosillo, Sonora. The Secretariat of Security and Civilian Protection (SSPC) confirmed that Oseguera González stay in Sonora was temporary, and confirmed that the U.S. had an outstanding extradition request against him.

Extradition process 
On 3 February 2017, the United States District Court for the District of Columbia issued an arrest warrant against Oseguera González. The Drug Enforcement Administration (DEA) stated that he had been involved in importing and distributing narcotics from Mexico to the U.S. since 2011. The DEA stated that Oseguera González had several other aliases, including "Rubencito", "El Rojo", "El Ruso", and "El Niño". According to the report, the United States Department of Justice was going to seize all of Oseguera González assets in the U.S. that were a result of his drug proceeds. With the arrest warrant, the U.S. government could formally request his extradition to the U.S.

On 4 October 2018, Mexico's Secretariat of Foreign Affairs (SRE) approved Oseguera González's extradition to the U.S. He issued a writ of amparo to prevent his extradition. On 16 October 2018, the United States Department of State, Treasury, and Justice announced a joint law enforcement measure against the CJNG, and publicized previously sealed indictments charging Oseguera González. The report stated that between 2007 and February 2017, Oseguera González was responsible for importing and distributing narcotics in the U.S. from Mexico, and of using firearms during and to retaliate for his alleged drug trafficking activities. The U.S. government confirmed that the extradition of Oseguera González was pending.

In July 2019, Oseguera González's writ of amparo issued against the SRE's extradition approval was denied. His defense argued that Oseguera González was not the person the U.S. government was looking for, and that he was not the son of Oseguera Cervantes. This statement was provided by the defense and support by one of their witnesses. In addition, Oseguera González's defense argued that extraditing him to the U.S. would be unconstitutional because the charges he faces in the U.S. could carry life imprisonment, a conviction length that does not exist in Mexico.

On 21 February 2020, Oseguera González was extradited to the U.S. He arrived in Dulles International Airport in Washington, D.C. and appeared before a judge that day to face his outstanding charges.

See also
Mexican Drug War

Sources

Footnotes

References

External links

Jalisco New Generation Cartel – InSight Crime

1990 births
People from San Francisco
People from Jalisco
Jalisco New Generation Cartel
Fugitives wanted by the United States
Living people
Mexican crime bosses
American people of Mexican descent
People of the Mexican Drug War